Charles Killick Millard (1870–1952) was a British doctor who in 1935 founded the Voluntary Euthanasia Legalisation Society (now Dignity in Dying), a movement that campaigned for the legalisation of euthanasia in Great Britain. In addition to supporting euthanasia, Millard had supported movements advocating for temperance, eugenics, cremation and birth control, and help found the first birth control clinic in Leicester. He received his MD degree in 1896 and served as Medical Officer of Health for Leicester from 1901 to 1935.

There had been strong opposition to compulsory smallpox vaccination in Leicester for many years and, as a strong supporter of vaccination, Millard had to work within this established framework. Whilst still supporting vaccination he argued against compulsory vaccination of infants and the use of mass vaccination to control outbreaks. Instead, he advocated isolation of cases and voluntary vaccination of medical and nursing staff and of contacts of cases. This proved successful and was adopted generally when compulsory vaccination was abolished.

His son Maurice Langley Millard MB ChB (1900–1987), educated at Bradfield College and Birmingham University, was a long-serving general medical practitioner in Leicester.  In his younger days he was a noted rugby player for Leicester Tigers and also for the county team. In 1931 he married Barbara Morrison (1903–1987), youngest daughter of Peter William Purves and his wife Mary Gundred Warren; they had no children. He was an Anglican.

Selected publications

The Vaccination Question in the Light of Modern Experience (1914)
The End of Compulsory Vaccination (1948)

References

External links
 
 Dignity in Dying (UK)

1870 births
1952 deaths
20th-century English medical doctors
British birth control activists
Euthanasia activists
Unitarian Universalists